Gulf Helicopters is a helicopter services provider mainly servicing the oil and gas industry in Middle East, Yemen, North Africa and India.  It is a 100% subsidiary of Gulf International Services under the QatarEnergy umbrella, and has its headquarters in Doha, Qatar. Gulf Helicopters provides transport services to customers in Persian Gulf, Yemen, North Africa and India. Among other services they offer Seismic Support, Load Lifting, Support of 'ad hoc' short-term contracts, VIP Executive Transport, and Helicopter Emergency Medical Services. The company operates a fleet of 37 helicopters and has 300 employees. They also have offices in West Sussex, U.K., Mumbai, India, and Tripoli, Libya.

History
Gulf Helicopters was established in 1970 in Doha. It was initially set up in February 1973 as a joint venture company involving British Overseas Airways, British European Helicopters and Gulf Aviation Services to provide helicopter service to oil companies developing the offshore exploration and production industry. In March 1977, Gulf Aviation Company Ltd. purchased Gulf Helicopters for the intention of developing economic cooperation and air transportation for the region. Then in June 1998 the company was purchased again by Qatar General Petroleum Corporation. The company is a member of the Helicopter Association International and received the Operator's Safety Award in 1995, 1996, 2013, 2014, 2015, 2016 and 2017. Technical Safety Awards were awarded to several members of the engineering staff in 1998.

Mohammed Al Mohannadi is the CEO of the company.

Fleet

Gulf Helicopters currently operates a fleet of 48 helicopters  (Feb 2016) including the following:
 2 Sikorsky S-92
 18 AgustaWestland AW139
 5 AgustaWestland AW189
 2 Bell 212 
 17 Bell 412 
 2 MD 902 
 2 Bell 206

References

HeliHub, (22 February 2010), Gulf Helicopters wins three year offshore contract, retrieved 26 August 2012.

External links
 

Airlines established in 1970
Airlines of Qatar
Companies based in Doha
Helicopter airlines
Qatari companies established in 1970